The 1997 NCAA Division II football season, part of college football in the United States organized by the National Collegiate Athletic Association at the Division II level, began on September 6, 1997, and concluded with the NCAA Division II Football Championship on December 13, 1997, at Braly Municipal Stadium in Florence, Alabama, hosted by the University of North Alabama.

Northern Colorado defeated New Haven in the championship game, 51–0, to win their second Division II national title.

The Harlon Hill Trophy was awarded to Irvin Sigler, running back from Bloomsburg.

Conference changes and new programs

Conference standings

Conference summaries

Postseason

The 1997 NCAA Division II Football Championship playoffs were the 24th single-elimination tournament to determine the national champion of men's NCAA Division II college football. The championship game was held at Braly Municipal Stadium in Florence, Alabama, for the 11th time.

Playoff bracket

See also
 1997 NCAA Division I-A football season
 1997 NCAA Division I-AA football season
 1997 NCAA Division III football season
 1997 NAIA Division I football season
 1997 NAIA Division II football season

References